Louise Rutter (born September 15, 1887 – died before 1972) was an American actress of the stage and screen.

Early life
Louise Rutter was born on September 15, 1887 in Baltimore, Maryland, although some sources give Philadelphia as her birthplace.

Career
Rutter acted on stage from her youth, in The Bonnie Brier Bush, The College Widow, The Lion and the Mouse, and The Heir to Hoorah. On Broadway, she had roles in such shows as Secret Service, The Devil, Held by the Enemy, The Sins of Society (1909), Know Thyself (1909), Mid-Channel (1910), Sherlock Holmes (1910), Passers-by (1911), A Rich Man's Son (1912), Moloch (1915), Turn to the Right (1916-1917), The Man of the Hour, and A Successful Calamity.

Rutter appeared in three silent films in 1915: Milestones of Life (Thanhouser), An Affair of Three Nations (Pathé), and The Menace of the Mute (Pathé).  The latter two films were part of a detective series based on stories by John T. McIntyre. "I realize that the motion picture will soon take the place of the speaking stage," she said at the time. "Motion pictures are just beginning. Imagine, then, what the future has in store, figuring on this basis."

Personal life
Louise Rutter married Charles Perkins, an English brewer, in 1911. In 1972, a Sherlock Holmes deerstalker cap and other memorabilia from the career of actor William Gillette were donated to the State of Connecticut for display at Gillette Castle, by Doreen Carlos-Perkins, daughter of Louise Rutter. Rutter had starred with Gillette in several plays, and played "Alice Faulkner" alongside his famous rendition of Sherlock Holmes.

References

External links
 
 
 A 1906 photograph of Louise Rutter in costume for The College Widow, from University of Washington Libraries, Special Collections Division; at The Early History of Theatre in Seattle.

1887 births
American actresses
Year of death missing